Mustapha El Fekkak (born 1986), also known as Mustapha Swinga, is a Moroccan YouTuber and businessman, mostly known for his program "Aji Tfham" (come to understand) in Moroccan Darija. In 2014, he won the prize of "Person of the Year" in the 7th edition of Maroc Web Awards, Creativity category.

Life 
Mustapha Swinga was born in Imintanoute, Morocco, in 1986. When he was young, his family moved to Casablanca. He received a degree as an IT technician and worked in the field for a year and a half with a measly monthly salary (around 2000 MAD, equivalent to about 200 Euro), then quit his job to study at the Moroccan National Circus Institute Shemsy in Salé, and graduated after three years as a circus performer and stage director.

He did video montage and assistance for another Moroccan Youtuber in 2011, before he decided to start his own channel Aji-Tfham in 2015, which quickly grew into fame and success within Morocco, reaching more than 25 million views to-date. He then co-founded the company ArtCoustic which provides animations for customers, such as banks and companies, as well as consultation in matters of communication.

Work 
Mustapha Swinga tackled many important topics, from different areas such as politics, law, economics, and science, simplifying them for the Moroccan public in the commonly spoken Moroccan Darija, with professional animation. Some of these topics include the history of ISIS, Bitcoin and Cryptocurrencies, VAT, oil prices and COVID-19, as well as some topics of national concern such as the Moroccan elections, institutions and new legislations.

References 

1986 births
Living people
People from Marrakesh-Safi
Shilha people
Educational and science YouTubers